The Clarkson–Rensselaer men's ice hockey rivalry is a college ice hockey rivalry between the Clarkson Golden Knights men's ice hockey and RPI Engineers men's ice hockey programs. The first meeting between the two occurred on January 24, 1925.

History
Rensselaer's ice hockey program is one of the oldest in the country, tracing its beginning back to 1902. Clarkson began its program almost 20 years later and while RPI was one of the nearest potential opponents, the two didn't meet until Clarkson's 5th season of play. Due to a combination of several circumstances, including a limited schedule for both teams and RPI suspending its program for most of the 1930s and 40s, the two did not meet again until 1951. The second match occurred the same year that both schools founded the Tri-State League, the first official conference for NCAA ice hockey. Since then, the two have remained conference rivals, with both also being founding members of ECAC Hockey in 1961. Since 1953, Clarkson and Rensselaer have played one another at least twice every season until RPI was forced to cancel its entire 20–21 season due to the COVID-19 pandemic.

Game results
Full game results for the rivalry, with rankings beginning in the 1998–99 season.

Series facts

References

External links
 Clarkson Golden Knights men's ice hockey
 RPI Engineers men's ice hockey

College ice hockey rivalries in the United States
ECAC Hockey
Clarkson Golden Knights men's ice hockey
RPI Engineers men's ice hockey
1925 establishments in New York (state)